The 1971–72 Northern Rugby Football League season was the 77th season of rugby league football. This season saw the entry of rugby league's first sponsors: Joshua Tetley and John Player.

Season summary

This season saw the introduction of the League Cup competition as a major secondary competition to the Challenge Cup. Due to sponsorship it was never commonly known as the League Cup. It began in this year as the Player's No.6 Trophy and finished up as the Regal Trophy before being abandoned after 1995-96 when the sport switched to summer.

Leeds won their third Championship when they beat St. Helens 9-5 in the Championship Final. Leeds also finished the regular season as league leaders.

The Challenge Cup winners were St. Helens who beat Leeds 16-13 in the final.

Player's No.6 Trophy winners were Halifax who beat Wakefield Trinity 22-11 in the final.

Wigan beat Widnes 15–8 to win the Lancashire County Cup, and Hull Kingston Rovers beat Castleford 11–7 to win the Yorkshire County Cup.

Championship

Play-offs

Final
The Championship final was played at Swinton.

Leeds scorers: John Atkinson (1 try), Terry Clawson (3 goals)

St Helens scorers: Les Greenall (1 try), John Walsh (1 goal)

Challenge Cup

The final was played between St. Helens and Leeds at Wembley Stadium, London on Saturday 13 May 1972, in front of a crowd of 89,495. After leading 12-6 at half time, St Helens beat Leeds 16-13.
St Helens scorers were Les Jones (1 try), Graham Rees (1 try), and Kel Coslett (5 goals). St Helens forward Kel Coslett was the man of the match winning the Lance Todd Trophy.
This was St Helens’ fourth Cup Final win in eight Final appearances.

League Cup

References

Sources
 1971-72 Rugby Football League season at wigan.rlfans.com 
 The Challenge Cup at The Rugby Football League website

1971 in English rugby league
1972 in English rugby league
Northern Rugby Football League seasons